Sociedade Esportiva Palmeiras, abbreviated as S.E. Palmeiras, and also commonly known as Palmeiras Basquete, is a Brazilian men's professional basketball club that is based in São Paulo, Brazil. It is a part of the multi-sports club Sociedade Esportiva Palmeiras. The club competes in the top-tier level Brazilian League.

History
S.E. Palmeiras' basketball section was founded in 1923, under the club's original name of Palestra Itália. The club won the Brazilian Basketball Cup (Brazilian Championship), in 1977. Over the years, the club has featured three of the best Brazilian basketball players of all time, Bira Maciel, Oscar Schmidt, and Leandrinho Barbosa.

Honors and titles

Continental
 South American Club Championship
 Runners-up (1): 1977

National
 Brazilian Championship
 Champions (1): 1977
 Runners-up (2): 1975, 1978

Inter-regional
Copa Brasil Sudeste (1): 2012

Regional
 São Paulo State Championship
 Champions (8): 1932, 1933, 1934, 1958, 1961, 1963, 1972, 1974
 Runners-up (5): 1960, 1962, 1965, 1975, 1976
Campeonato Paulista A2
Champions: 2011

Players

Roster

Notable players

 Emil Assad Rached
 Leandrinho Barbosa
 Edson Bispo
 Rosa Branca
 Zé Geraldo
 Ricardo Cardoso Guimarães
 Gilson Trinidade de Jesus
 Washington Joseph
 Marcel de Souza
 Carlos Domingos Massoni
 Bira Maciel
 Luiz Cláudio Menon
 Cláudio Mortari
 Adilson Nascimento
 Diego Pinheiro
 Jatyr Eduardo Schall
 Oscar Schmidt
 Edvar Simões
 Milton Setrini
 João Vianna
 Paulinho Villas Boas
 Nicolás Gianella
 Maxi Stanic

Notable coaches
 Togo "Kanela" Renan Soares
 Wlamir Marques
 Cláudio Mortari

References

External links
Official Website 
NBB Team Page 
Latinbasket.com Team Page

Basketball teams in Brazil
Basketball teams in São Paulo
Basketball teams established in 1923
Novo Basquete Brasil